Hjelmshoved is a small Danish island in the South Funen Archipelago, lying south of Funen. Hjælmshoved covers an area of 0.2 km2.

References 

Geography of Svendborg Municipality
Danish islands in the Baltic
Islands of Denmark